Charles "C. J." Ah You, Jr. (born July 7, 1982) is an American football coach and former defensive end. He was drafted by the Buffalo Bills in the seventh round of the 2007 NFL Draft and spent most of his career with the St. Louis Rams. He played college football at BYU and Oklahoma.

High school
Ah You played high school football at Lone Peak High School in Highland, Utah. He was named defensive line MVP during senior season there.

College career
Ah You started at Brigham Young University in 2001 when he had 9 tackles, 2 for losses and 2 sacks in three games. Ah You Redshirted '02 at BYU with a right knee injury. Due to violations of BYU's honor code, Ah You was expelled from BYU in January 2004. He transferred to Snow College in 2004. He then transferred to the University of Oklahoma in 2005 and earned Big 12 Defensive Newcomer of the Year. He was also honorable mention All-Big 12 in 2005. In 2005, he had 45 tackles, with 12 going for losses and seven sacks. He also forced three fumbles and broke up two passes. In 2006, he played 14 games with nine starts with 43 tackles (25 solo) and 10 for losses, with four being sacks. He also forced a fumble and broke up three passes. Ah You played in 26 games with 21 starts at Oklahoma totaling 11 career sacks in two seasons with 88 tackles, 22 for losses to go with the 11 sacks and four forced fumbles. For his 2006 efforts he was named First-team All-Big 12.

NFL

Pre-draft

Buffalo Bills
Ah You entered the NFL as a seventh-round draft choice (239th overall) of the Buffalo Bills in the 2007 NFL Draft. He spent the preseason with Bills before being released on September 2, 2007.

St. Louis Rams
He added to the Rams' practice squad on November 21, 2007. He played his first NFL game in the 2009 season opener against the Seattle Seahawks. He played mostly in the Rams nickel defense, rushing as a defensive tackle. He injured his knee in Week 10 and was placed on injured reserve. He underwent knee surgery on his left knee. He ended the season with 17 tackles and one sack.

The Rams released Ah You to free agency on March 13, 2012.

Coaching 
Ah You was hired as the Special Teams Quality Control Coach at Oklahoma by Bob Stoops in 2015. On January 14, 2016, it was announced that Vanderbilt had hired Ah You as Defensive Line Coach under Head Coach and Defensive Coordinator Derek Mason.

In 2019, Ah You joined the New York Guardians of the XFL as defensive line coach.

Ah You was hired as a quality control analyst at USC in 2021. Ah You was hired as the defensive line coach at Nevada in January of 2022, but less than a month later, he accepted the outside linebackers job at Texas Tech.

Personal
He is related to several football players—his father, Charles Sr., who played for BYU; his brother, Matt, who was a linebacker at BYU, and his uncle, Junior Ah You, who was a defensive end for Arizona State, the United States Football League and the Canadian Football League and is a member of the Canadian Football Hall of Fame. Ah You is of Samoan, German, and Chinese descent.

References

External links
 C. J. Ah You on Twitter
 Vanderbilt Commodores bio

1982 births
Living people
American football defensive ends
Buffalo Bills players
BYU Cougars football players
New York Guardians coaches
Oklahoma Sooners football players
Sportspeople from Orange County, California
St. Louis Rams players
USC Trojans football coaches
Vanderbilt Commodores football coaches
People from La Habra, California
People from Highland, Utah
Players of American football from Utah
American sportspeople of Chinese descent
American sportspeople of Samoan descent
American people of German descent
Snow Badgers football players